The Virginia Indigent Defense Commission (VIDC) provides legal defense to indigent clients accused of crimes. VIDC operates 28 offices across the Commonwealth of Virginia. VIDC also manages the certification of public defenders and court-appointed attorneys throughout Virginia and provides training to defense attorneys.

History

Public Defender Commission (1972–2004)
In 1972, the Virginia General Assembly piloted two public defender offices to determine if the offices would work better than appointing private attorneys to cases with indigent clients. The Staunton office was opened first, followed by the Virginia Beach office a few months later. The first chief public defender of the Staunton office, Coy M. Kiser, Jr. started the office with one investigator, a secretary, and two part-time assistant public defenders. Kiser was appointed to a judgeship two years later and was replaced by William E. Bobbitt, who served in the Staunton office for over thirty years.

Virginia Indigent Defense Commission (2004–present)
The VIDC was established by statute in 2004 and replaced the Public Defender Commission. The VIDC replaced court-appointed lawyers in death penalty cases with full-time public defenders. David Johnson was named Executive Director of the agency in 2005.

In June 2020, several employees attended a protest in Portsmouth and in August 2020, three employees were charged with felony vandalism of a confederate monument, alongside state senator Louise Lucas, and three NAACP representatives. The charges were announced by the Portsmouth Police Department one day prior to a special legislative session pushing for policing reform. The Virginia Legislative Black Caucus condemned the charges and several Virginia politicians expressed concern about the timing. When the charges were announced, the Portsmouth Commonwealth's Attorney's office had not approved the charges and the police department had taken the charges directly to the magistrate. Later, Stephanie  Morales, the Commonwealth's Attorney, stated there was insufficient evidence to take a case against any of the nineteen defendants to trial, and Judge Claire G. Cardwell dismissed the charged in November 2020. Cardwell determined that police went around prosecutors to file charges and attempted to prevent Morales from prosecuting the case by subpoenaing her as a witness. Cardwell found the charges to be concerning and suggested that the Portsmouth Police were not motivated by public safety. The three public defenders and eight others who had been charged sued the city, claiming that their rights were violated and they were improperly defamed, and in October 2021 they received settlement checks from the city for $15,000 each.

In March 2021, Virginia banned capital punishment and VIDC announced that the capital defense offices located in Vienna, Norfolk, Roanoke, and Richmond would close.

In October 2021, VIDC opened an office in Chesterfield.

In September 2022, Maria Jankowski was promoted from Deputy Executive Director of VIDC to Executive Director after David Johnson retired. Timothy Coyne, the former Chief Public Defender for the Winchester and Front Royal offices, was named to replace Jankowski as Deputy Executive Director of the commission.

Locations

 Alexandria
 Arlington County
 Bedford
 Charlottesville
 Chesapeake
 Chesterfield
 Danville
 Fairfax
 Franklin
 Fredericksburg - serves Stafford, Spotsylvania, and King George counties

 Front Royal - serves Shenandoah, Warren, and Page counties
 Halifax
 Hampton
 Leesburg - serves Loudoun County
 Lexington
 Lynchburg
 Martinsville
 Newport News
 Norfolk
 Petersburg

 Portsmouth
 Prince William County
 Pulaski
 Richmond
 Roanoke
 Staunton - serves Augusta and Rockbridge counties
 Suffolk
 Virginia Beach
 Warrenton
 Winchester - serves Frederick County and Clarke County

Notable employees and former employees
 Claire G. Cardwell, judge for the Thirteenth Circuit of Virginia
 Coy M. Kiser, Jr. (1933-2012), first public defender in Virginia and judge in the General District Court of the 25th Judicial District of Virginia
 Brenda Spry, judge for the Third Circuit of Virginia

References

Legal aid in the United States
Government of Virginia
Criminal defense organizations
Public defense institutions